Aberporth Airport  is situated southwest of Aberporth, Ceredigion, Wales. The airport is being developed as West Wales Airport for domestic flights. It is also developing as a centre for the deployment of civil and military unmanned aerial vehicles (UAVs), known as 'drones'.

History

The following military units were posted here at some point:
 'B' Flight of No. 1 Anti-Aircraft Co-operation Unit RAF (1 AACU)
 'L' Flight of 1 AACU
 'O' Flight of 1 AACU
 'Q' Flight of 1 AACU
 'X' Flight of 1 AACU
 No. 6 Anti-Aircraft Co-operation Unit RAF
 No. 6 Air Observers School RAF
 No. 7 Anti-Aircraft Co-operation Unit RAF
 No. 7 Maintenance Unit RAF
 No. 595 Squadron RAF
 No. 636 Volunteer Gliding Squadron RAF
 No. 1608 (Anti-Aircraft Co-operation) Flight RAF
 No. 1609 (Anti-Aircraft Co-operation) Flight RAF
 No. 1621 (Anti-Aircraft Co-operation) Flight RAF
 No. 2758 Squadron RAF Regiment
 Combined Services Projectile Development Establishment
 University of Wales Air Squadron

Current use

The nearby range, MoD Aberporth, is used for testing rockets by the British military, as well as for launching civilian rockets for atmospheric research. The site is currently managed by QinetiQ.

Aberporth Aerodrome has a CAA Ordinary Licence (Number P859) that allows flights for the public transport of passengers or for flying instruction as authorised by the licensee. The aerodrome is not licensed for night use.

The airfield is being used as a base for Thales Watchkeeper WK450 military unmanned aerial vehicle (UAV) trials over Cardigan Bay. On 13 June 2018 a Watchkeeper crashed into a lane near the airfield; there were no injuries.

References

External links
Aberporth Technology Park and West Wales Airport – An Overview of Proposals, Innovations and Benefits.

Transport in Ceredigion
Airports in Wales
Buildings and structures in Ceredigion